Oday Samir Zahran is a Jordanian footballer who plays for Al-Faisaly and the Jordan national football team.

International career
Zahran's first international match with the Jordan national senior team was against Iraq on 10 December 2012 in the 2012 WAFF Championship, which resulted in a 1–0 loss for Jordan.

International career statistics

References

External links 
 
 
 

1991 births
Association football defenders
Jordanian footballers
Jordan international footballers
Living people
2015 AFC Asian Cup players
Al-Faisaly SC players
Shabab Al-Ordon Club players
Footballers at the 2010 Asian Games
Sportspeople from Amman
Asian Games competitors for Jordan